Jeroen Tesselaar (born 16 January 1989) is a Dutch footballer who plays as a left back for Tweede Divisie club Quick Boys. He has previously played for AZ Alkmaar, Telstar, Kilmarnock, St Mirren and De Graafschap.

Career

AZ
Tesselaar started his professional career in his native Netherlands with HVV Hollandia at age thirteen before joining AZ Alkmaar. In the 2008–09 season, Tesselaar signed his first professional contract, which will keep him until 2010. He did not make a league appearance for the club, but played on loan for Telstar for three seasons with AZ players Furdjel Narsingh and Kevin Brands.

At the end of the 2010–11 season, Tesselaar was among eleven players to be released.

St Mirren
After leaving AZ, Tesselaar went on trial with Scottish Premier League club St Mirren. The first time he arrived there, he said about the club, "[I] didn't know what the group wanted but, after the first week, we saw a little movie of Barcelona and how they press the ball."

On 14 July 2011, Tesselaar would later signed for St Mirren on a one-year deal after making impressive display on trial. Upon joining St Mirren, Tesselaar cited joining the club as "efforts to play total football." He made his debut against Dunfermline at East End Park on 25 July. On 20 August, he assisted both St Mirren goals for Steven Thomson, who scored both goals in a 2–1 victory at Easter Road against Hibernian.

Tesselaar never thought what to expect, but finds the quality good. Tesselaar quickly settled in Scotland and played regularly during the 2011–12 Scottish Premier League season, but their good performances led manager Danny Lennon to offer both Tesselaar and Nigel Hasselbaink improved contracts, only the offer of a new contract at St Mirren to be rejected despite captain Jim Goodwin pleading the duo to sign a new contract. Though making thirty-three appearances, Tesselaar was absent due to an injury that kept him out for six weeks.

Kilmarnock
Tesselaar signed for Kilmarnock in June 2012 on a two-year contract despite interests from Aberdeen. On his move, Manager Kenny Shiels told STV, "We're really happy to get him on board because we've lost Ben Gordon so now we've got competition between Rory McKeown and Jeroen."

Tesselaar made his debut for the club, in the opening game of the season, as Kilmarnock drew 0–0 with Dundee, where he started as a left-back in defense. After making four appearances, Tesselaar sustained an injury during a match against Stenhousemuir, in the first round of the Scottish League Cup, which Kilmarnock lose 2–1. Tesselaar was out for six weeks due to a hamstring injury. After two months out, Tesselaar made his return, where he came on for James Dayton in the last minutes, as they beat Celtic, to give their first win at Celtic Park for the first time since 1955. He made his first start since being injured, as Kilmarnock beat Ross County 3–0 on 9 November 2012. He finished his first season at the club, making twenty-six appearances.

In his second season, Tesselaar continues to remain in the left-back position until he came off in the sixth minutes in the first half, in a 1–1 draw against Partick Thistle on 21 September 2013.

During the season, Tesselaar broke his nose in four occasion that he might wear a protective mask for the rest of his career. In a match against Hearts on 8 March 2014, Tesselaar made national headlines in the Netherlands when he made fabulous way through the legs of Jordan McGhee and then he gave the ball which was scored by Michael Gardyne, in a 4–2 victory. At the end of the 2013–14 season, Tesselaar was offered a new contract by the club. While negotiating a new contract, Tesselaar faced uncertainty over his future: "I'm open to everything. A new club is a nice adventure." However, Tesselaar left Kilmarnock in late June.

Return to St Mirren
Tesselaar re-joined St Mirren on a one-year deal, after leaving Kilmarnock at the end of season 2013–14. The Dutchman previously played for the Saints during season 2011–12 in the Scottish Premier League, making 33 league appearances.

Tesselaar's second spell at St Mirren came in the opening game of the season, playing as a left-back, in a 1-0 loss against Motherwell. Tesselaar made his 50th appearance, in a 2-1 loss against Celtic before coming off by half time, due to an injury. Tesselaar then suffered a knee injury that kept him out before scoring and assisting on his return, in a 2-2 draw against Ross County on 25 October 2014. However, Tesselaar came under pressure from St Mirren supporters after an interview with Voetbal International, claiming about negativity of the town of Paisley. Tesselaar later denied those statement he made in the Voetbal International. Nevertheless, Tesselaar continued to be in the first team regular throughout the season.

On 29 May 2015, Tesselaar left Saints for a second time in his career, making a total of 36 appearances and scoring once.

Later career
Tesselaar signed a one-year deal with Eredivisie side, De Graafschap on 14 August 2015 after a successful trial period.

He has played for Hapoel Ramat Gan and Hapoel Katamon in Israel.

Personal life
Tesselaar is an avid photographer and considered taking photos his second hobby after buying his first camera when he was sixteen. He often bikes or walks to take pictures and took pictures in black and white when he attended photography school.

References

External links

1989 births
Living people
Dutch footballers
Dutch expatriate footballers
St Mirren F.C. players
AZ Alkmaar players
SC Telstar players
Kilmarnock F.C. players
De Graafschap players
Hapoel Ramat Gan F.C. players
Hapoel Katamon Jerusalem F.C. players
Quick Boys players
Eredivisie players
Eerste Divisie players
Scottish Premier League players
Liga Leumit players
Scottish Professional Football League players
Expatriate footballers in Scotland
Association football defenders
People from Wognum
Expatriate footballers in Israel
Dutch expatriate sportspeople in Scotland
Dutch expatriate sportspeople in Israel
Tweede Divisie players
HVV Hollandia players
Footballers from North Holland